The 2019 FIM CEV Moto2 European Championship is the tenth CEV Moto2 season and the fourth under the FIM banner.

Calendar
The following races are scheduled to take place in 2019.

Entry list

Championship standings
Scoring system
Points were awarded to the top fifteen finishers. A rider had to finish the race to earn points.

Riders' championship

Manufacturers' championship

References

External links 

FIM CEV Moto2 European Championship
Moto2 European Championship